Our Father and the Gypsy (Swedish: Gud Fader och tattaren or Tattarblod) is a 1954 Swedish drama film directed by Hampe Faustman and starring Ulf Palme, Adolf Jahr and Doris Svedlund. It was shot at the Centrumateljéerna Studios in Stockholm with location shooting around Haninge. The film's sets were designed by the art director Nils Nilsson.

Cast
 Ulf Palme as David Vallander
 Adolf Jahr as 	Frasse Vallander
 Doris Svedlund as 	Blenda
 John Elfström as Johan Tapper
 Josua Bengtson as 	Berg
 Gull Natorp as 	Rakel Demant
 Axel Högel as 	Josef Demant
 Jan Malmsjö as 	Jonatan Demant
 Jan Olov Andersson as 	Lennart Vallander 
 Peter Lindgren as 	Mickel
 Allan Edwall as 	Natan 
 Gunvor Pontén as 	Ragnhild
 Ulla Sjöblom as 	Frasse's Daughter
 Märta Dorff as 	Frasse's Wife
 Hans Strååt as 	Efraim
 Margit Andelius as 	Teresia 
 Gregor Dahlman as Villager at Auction
 Olle Ekbladh as Villager at Auction 
 Gösta Gustafson as Train Conductor 
 Ivar Hallbäck as 	Villager 
 Gösta Holmström as 	Villager 
 Stig Johanson as 	Marshal 
 Ulf Johansson as Axel Axelsson 
 Gunnar Källving as 	Petter 
 Birger Lensander as 	Lumberjack 
 Arne Lindblad as 	Horse Owner 
 Adèle Lundvall as 	Villager 
 Gustaf Lövås as 	Lumberjack 
 Rune Ottoson as 	Villager at Auction 
 Birger Sahlberg as 	Farmer Opening Gate 
 Hanny Schedin as 	Villager 
 Sture Ström as Villager 
 Rune Stylander as Tradesman 
 Bengt Sundmark as 	Lumberjack 
 Elsa Textorius as 	Miss Tobiasson 
 Ivar Wahlgren as 	Auctioneer 
 Birger Åsander as Villager

References

Bibliography 
 Qvist, Per Olov & von Bagh, Peter. Guide to the Cinema of Sweden and Finland. Greenwood Publishing Group, 2000.
 Wright, Rochelle. The Visible Wall: Jews and Other Ethnic Outsiders in Swedish Film. SIU Press, 1998.

External links 
 

1954 films
Swedish drama films
1954 drama films
1950s Swedish-language films
Films directed by Hampe Faustman
1950s Swedish films